Nurabad-e Sar Talap (also Romanized as Nūrābād-e Sar Talāp) is a village in Karvandar Rural District, in the Central District of Khash County, Sistan and Baluchestan Province, Iran. At the 2006 census, its population was 447, in 85 families.

References 

Populated places in Khash County